Lado Fumic (born 20 May 1976) is a German former professional cross-country mountain biker. He is the older brother of fellow cyclist Manuel Fumic. He competed at the 2000 and 2004 Summer Olympics, finishing 5th in the cross-country in 2000. He is of Croatian ancestry.

Major results

2000
 1st  National Cross-country Championships
2001
 1st  National Cross-country Championships
 3rd Cross-country, European Mountain Bike Championships
2002
 1st  National Cross-country Championships
 2nd Cross-country, European Mountain Bike Championships
2003
 1st  National Cross-country Championships
 3rd Cross-country, European Mountain Bike Championships
2004
 1st  National Cross-country Championships
 2nd Cross-country, European Mountain Bike Championships
2005
 1st  National Cross-country Championships
 1st  National Cross-country Marathon Championships

References

External links

German male cyclists
Cross-country mountain bikers
1976 births
Living people
Olympic cyclists of Germany
Cyclists at the 2000 Summer Olympics
Cyclists at the 2004 Summer Olympics
People from Kirchheim unter Teck
Sportspeople from Stuttgart (region)
Cyclists from Baden-Württemberg
German mountain bikers
German people of Croatian descent